Pavel Olegovich Savitsky (born 12 July 1994) is a Belarusian professional footballer who plays as an attacking midfielder for Neman Grodno and the Belarus national team.

Career
Born in Grodno, Savitsky began playing football in Neman Grodno youth system. He joined the senior team and made his Belarusian Premier League debut in 2011.

In 2014, he was loaned to Jagiellonia Białystok in Poland. However, he only made five league appearances there and was accused of putting entertainment before football.

International goals
Scores and results list Belarus' goal tally first.

Honours
Dinamo Brest
Belarusian Premier League champion: 2019
Belarusian Cup winner: 2017–18
Belarusian Super Cup winner: 2018, 2019, 2020

References

External links
 
 
 
 

1994 births
Living people
Sportspeople from Grodno
Belarusian footballers
Association football midfielders
Belarus international footballers
Belarusian expatriate footballers
Expatriate footballers in Poland
Belarusian expatriate sportspeople in Poland
Ekstraklasa players
FC Neman Grodno players
Jagiellonia Białystok players
FC Dynamo Brest players
FC Rukh Brest players